Glenea algebraica is a species of beetle in the family Cerambycidae. It was described by James Thomson in 1857. It is known from Borneo, Malaysia, Java and Sumatra.

Varietas
 Glenea algebraica var. analytica Pascoe, 1867
 Glenea algebraica var. griseofrontalis Breuning, 1956
 Glenea algebraica var. griseosuturalis Pic, 1943
 Glenea algebraica var. mediovittata Pic, 1943
 Glenea algebraica var. tenuefasciata Breuning, 1956

References

algebraica
Beetles described in 1857